Pigi is a local community of the Rethymno Municipality in the  Rethymno regional unit of the region of Crete established by Kallikratis reform. Previously, it was part of the municipal district of Municipality of Arkadi. Capital of the new municipality is Rethymno.

Geography and history
Pigi is located 9 km east of the city of Rethymno, on the road towards Arkadi, at an altitude of 60 meters, 1 km from Adele village. It is situated in the heart of a fertile and relatively smooth area, which in older times it was called Aryan. It is noteworthy that the English traveller Robert Pashley was the one who first wrote about the origin of the name of the village, 170 years ago. The relevant note is the two-volume book of this great traveller, printed in London in 1837. He says among other things: "In Pigi - the name comes from a rich source that supplies the village with excellent water." Pigi is being inhabited from the Venetian period onwards.

An airstrip that used to be near Pigi was a strategic target for the German forces during the Battle of Crete.
Population of Pigi

Attractions
There are many churches and chapels inside/close to the village: Agia Paravskevi Church, Virgin Mary, Agios Georgios of Koutroulis, Agios Georgios (church cemetery), Agios Ioannis and others. Agios Nikolaos church is decorated with frescoes of the 14th century, St George Church has frescoes bearing the date 1411.

Transportation
There is bus service (KTEL) from/to Rethymno serving this area (services for Kyrianna and Loutra)

See also
List of settlements in the Rethymno regional unit
Pigi Airport

References

External links
Photo Gallery, Web site of municipality of Rethymnno retrieved at 9 April 2012
Cycling routes, Web site of Tourism Promotion Committee of Rethymno Prefecture, retrieved at 9 April 2012

Populated places in Rethymno (regional unit)